Patelloidea is a taxonomic superfamily of sea snails or true limpets, marine gastropod molluscs in the subclass Patellogastropoda

Genera 
Families within the superfamily Patelloidea include:
 Nacellidae Thiele, 1891
 Patellidae Rafinesque, 1815

References 

 Bouchet, P., Rocroi, J.-P. (2005). Classification and nomenclator of gastropod families. Malacologia. 47(1-2): 1-397 .

Patellogastropoda
Taxa named by Constantine Samuel Rafinesque